Maiuma or Maiumas was an ancient town at the site of present-day Rimal near Gaza, Palestine.

History of Maiuma
In antiquity, Gaza port was the principal port on the Mediterranean serving the Incense Road. Strabo and Ptolemy referred to it as Gazaion limen. The port was distinct from the city, which was located opposite it. 

The port of Gaza was at the end of the Nabataean spice road where trade was conducted in herbs, spices incense, drapery, glass and food. Goods arrived in the port on the backs of camels from Southern Arabia (the Kingdom of Sheba) through Petra, the Arava Valley and crossing the Negev Desert via Avdat. At the port of Gaza, these goods were dispatched to the European markets.

Alexander Jannaeus' conquest of Gaza (99 BCE) that denied the Nabateans access to the port and trade with Rome led to Obodas launching a military campaign against the Hasmonean king.

The port of Gaza was rebuilt after it was incorporated into the Roman Empire in 63 BCE under the command of Pompey Magnus and trade routes were reopened. 

It functioned as the port of Gaza (and was sometimes called simply "the port of Gaza",) but was recognized as an independent city since the early Christian era. The Greek name Neapolis ("the new city") seems to have also been used in reference to it. 

During the reign of Constantine the Great, who granted Maiuma the status of a separate city, it received the name Konstanteia after the emperor's sister (or son). It has been suggested that Maiuma's residents “collectively opted to convert to Christianity”. 

Under Emperor Julian, it was downgraded and the name was changed to Maioumas ("harbour place"), 
or as  "the part of Gaza towards the sea". Though it is sometimes associated with a pagan festival also called the Maiuma or Maiouma, the similarity of these names may be a coincidence. According to 6th-century scholar John Malalas, "the Mysteries of Dionysus and Aphrodite...is known as the Maioumas because it is celebrated in the month of May-Artemisios."

Christianity in Maiuma

Maiuma seems to have been an early center of the spread of Christianity, which may explain the treatment of its status by Constantine and Julian. Its population was said to have been largely Egyptian in origin. As the city regained its independence from Gaza, for a certain period of time it had its own bishop, due to Gaza's relatively long resistance to introduction of Christianity. The first known bishop of the city was a certain Zenon in the late 4th or early 5th century, mentioned by Sozomenus. Among others known are Paulianus (or Paulinianus), participant in the First Council of Ephesus in 431; Paul, who took part in the Second Council of Ephesus in 449; Peter the Iberian who was reluctant to serve in the office but was elected by the citizens in 452 nevertheless; John Rufus, his successor; and Procopius, chronologically the last known bishop of Maiuma, known to have participated in the Synod of Jerusalem of 581. Mention must also be made of St. Cosmas of Maiuma.

The city was famous for the fact that the tomb of a Saint Victor was located in it (although it is unclear which Saint Victor this was).

Bishops of Gaza
Maiuma is identified as the seat of the Roman era Diocese of Gaza. 
An incomplete list of bishops includes:
 Philemon (New Testament person)
 Porphyry of Gaza c. 347–420
 Paul of Gaza 308
 Timothy     304   Bishop of Gaza
 Hieromartyr Silvanus of Gaza, bishop, and with him 40 martyrs (311)
 Bishop Asclepas 325AD  attendee at the First Council of Nicaea
 Zeno (or Zenon) around 400AD   Bishop of Gaza 
 Peter the Iberian c. 411-491 elected c 453
 John Rufus, Peter's successor c491
 Paulinianus, c 431AD participant in the First Council of Ephesus
 Paul, c 449AD attendee at the Second Council of Ephesus
 Samonas Bishop of Gaza
 St. Cosmas of Maiuma. c742AD
 Procopius, chronologically the last known bishop of Maiuma, known to have participated in the Synod of Jerusalem of 581AD
 Henricus van de Wetering  ( Titular Archbishop of Gaza)

Remains of Maiuma

Maiuma is identified with al-Mina, about 4 kilometers from Gaza towards the sea. Remarkable archaeological findings from the site include the mosaic floor of a synagogue representing King David with a lyre, dated to the early 6th century AD and discovered in the mid-1960s. The city appears to have been fortified, but the enclosure wall still seems hard to trace.

Notes

Sources
  Realencyclopädie der Classischen Altertumswissenschaft, Band XIV, Halbband 27, Lysimachos-Mantike (1928), s. 610.
 Jordan: The Madaba Mosaic Map. DISCUSSION: Ascalon, Gaza, Negev and Sinai. 124. Maiumas, which is also Neapolis - (al-Minah). Accessed January 11, 2013.

Gaza Strip
History of Palestine (region)
Populated places of the Byzantine Empire